The Collège communautaire du Nouveau-Brunswick Bathurst Campus (CCNB) is a post-secondary educational institution in Bathurst, New Brunswick, Canada. CCNB is the heir of the Sacred Heart College, founded in 1899 in Caraquet, destroyed by fire in 1914 and rebuilt in Bathurst in 1921.

External links 
 Bathurst Campus

Buildings and structures in Bathurst, New Brunswick
Collège communautaire du Nouveau-Brunswick
Education in Bathurst, New Brunswick